Isaiah Culleen Carvajal Mendoza (born January 14, 1988), better known as IC Mendoza, is a Filipino actor, model, and television personality.

Early life
Isaiah Culleen Carvajal Mendoza was born on January 14, 1988, in Makati Medical Center, Makati, Philippines. He is the grandson of the late television personality and "Queen Of Intrigues" and the mother of Philippine Talk Shows Inday Badiday (Lourdes Carvajal) and son of entertainment columnist Dolly Anne Carvajal. His father Ed Mendoza was a former PBA basketball player who is now a pastor in New York. He came out as gay on The Buzz in 2005.

Filmography

Television

Film

References

1988 births
Living people
Filipino male child actors
Filipino male television actors
Filipino television personalities
Filipino gay actors
Filipino male film actors
GMA Network personalities
ABS-CBN personalities
TV5 (Philippine TV network) personalities